Ralph Hicks Harvey (July 20, 1893 – September 8, 1950) was a justice of the Supreme Court of Texas from March 1, 1949 to September 8, 1950. He died in office.

References

Justices of the Texas Supreme Court
1893 births
1950 deaths
20th-century American judges